Anthene ramnika is a butterfly in the family Lycaenidae. It is found in Cameroon and the Democratic Republic of the Congo (Uele).

References

Butterflies described in 1980
Anthene